Paul Jerricho (born 18 November 1948) is a British actor.

Early life 
Brought up in the Caribbean, Jerricho got into the acting bug after playing Joseph in a Nativity play. He received his training at the Drama Centre London.

Personal life 
From 1981 to 1984, Jerricho was married to the actress Barbara Kinghorn. He has two daughters and one son named Jack. Currently, the actor is in a relationship with actress Helena Little. He lives in Wimbledon.

Filmography

Film

Television

References

External links 

 
 Paul Jerricho at Theatricalia

English male soap opera actors
Living people
1948 births
Alumni of the Drama Centre London
People from Shropshire